Philip Ramos (born April 6, 1956) is an American politician who represents the 6th District of the New York Assembly. He is a Democrat. The district includes portions of the town of Islip, including Bay Shore, Brentwood, Central Islip and Islandia in Suffolk County on Long Island.

Ramos is the son of a correction officer and a registered nurse. He graduated from Brentwood High School in 1974, and went to work as a therapy aide at the Pilgrim Psychiatric Center. He later became an emergency medical technician.

Ramos later became a Suffolk County police officer. He worked eight years in the narcotics unit as an undercover officer. He was promoted to detective in 1987 and retired in 1999.

In 2002, Ramos opted to run for the New York Assembly to succeed Republican Robert Wertz, who was retiring after thirty years to seek a seat in the New York Senate. In a close race, he defeated Republican Philip Goglas 53% to 47%.

References

External links
The New York Assembly: Assemblyman Philip Ramos
Project Vote Smart Interest group ratings.

 

Living people
1956 births
Democratic Party members of the New York State Assembly
People from the Bronx
People from Central Islip, New York
21st-century American politicians